Antti Lovag (1920 – 27 September 2014) was a Hungarian architect. He is best known for his Palais Bulles (Bubble House) design. His mother was Finnish and father Russian.

References

External links
 The Antti Lovag Project

1920 births
2014 deaths
Architects from Budapest
Hungarian people of Finnish descent
Hungarian people of Russian descent